The 1976 season was the Minnesota Vikings' 16th in the National Football League (NFL). The Vikings finished with an 11–2–1 record to give them their eighth NFC Central division title. They beat the Washington Redskins 35–20 in the divisional round of the playoffs, followed by a 24–13 win over the Los Angeles Rams in the NFC Championship, before losing 32–14 to the Oakland Raiders in Super Bowl XI. As of 2023, this is the most recent Super Bowl appearance by the franchise.

Offseason

1976 Draft

 The Vikings traded running back Oscar Reed to the Atlanta Falcons in exchange for Atlanta's fifth-round selection (133rd overall).
 The Vikings traded their eighth-round selection (235th overall) and 1977 sixth-round selection (166th overall) to the New England Patriots in exchange for offensive lineman Doug Dumler.

Personnel

Staff

Roster

Preseason

Regular season

Schedule

Game summaries

Week 1: at New Orleans Saints

Week 2: vs. Los Angeles Rams

Week 3: at Detroit Lions

Week 4: vs. Pittsburgh Steelers

Week 5: vs. Chicago Bears

Week 6: vs. New York Giants

Week 7: at Philadelphia Eagles

Week 8: at Chicago Bears

Week 9: vs. Detroit Lions

Week 10: vs. Seattle Seahawks

Week 11: at Green Bay Packers

Week 12: at San Francisco 49ers

Week 13: vs. Green Bay Packers

Week 14: at Miami Dolphins

Standings

Postseason

Schedule

Game summaries

NFC Divisional Playoffs: vs. (#4) Washington Redskins

The Vikings jumped to a 35–6 lead by the end of the third quarter, led by running backs Chuck Foreman and Brent McClanahan who each rushed for more than 100 yards.

McClanahan's career-long 41-yard run on Minnesota's first play of the game set up quarterback Fran Tarkenton's 18-yard touchdown pass to tight end Stu Voigt. Washington defensive back Eddie Brown gave his team some early scoring opportunities with big special teams plays, first returning the kickoff 26 yards to the 38-yard line, and later returning a punt 17 yards to the Vikings 45. But the team was unable to capitalize. All they could do after the kickoff return was go three-and-out, and on the first play after his big punt return, Billy Kilmer threw a pass that was intercepted by Bobby Bryant. Now momentum seemed slipping away, but on the first play after Bryant's pick, Washington took the ball right back with an interception by safety Jake Scott, who returned it 17 yards to the Minnesota 34-yard line. Three plays later, Mark Moseley kicked a 47-yard field goal that cut the Washington deficit to 7–3. Later in the quarter, Minnesota drove 66 yards and scored when Tarkenton threw a 27-yard pass to Sammy White. Safety Ken Houston deflected the ball, but it still bounced to White, who made a diving, juggling catch for a touchdown to put the Vikings up 14–3. By the end of the first quarter, the Vikings had gained 143 yards, while holding Washington to 18 yards and no first downs.

The situation only got worse for Washington in the second quarter. A promising drive for them into Vikings territory ended with no points when Moseley missed a 51-yard field goal attempt. Minnesota then drove 66 yards, featuring a 35-yard completion from Tarkenton to Ahmad Rashad, to score on Foreman's 2-yard touchdown run, putting them up 21–3. The Redskins next drive ended with an interception by Vikings defensive back Nate Wright. On the next play, Houston intercepted the ball from Tarkenton and returned it 8 yards to the Vikings 38. But Washington was unable to move the ball and had to punt. In the final seconds of the half, Washington had a chance for a touchdown with a deep throw from Kilmer to receiver Frank Grant. Grant had broken open in the end zone, but was unable to make the catch and the pass fell incomplete.

Washington had to punt on the first drive of the second half, and Leonard Willis returned it 10 yards to the Vikings 48, where Minnesota proceeded to drive to a 28–3 lead on a 30-yard touchdown burst by Foreman. This time the Redskins were able to respond, converting a 20-yard catch by tight end Jean Fugett, a 20-yard run by Mike Thomas, and a 10-yard reception by fullback John Riggins into a 35-yard Moseley field goal, making the score 28–6. But after this, the Vikings drove 77 yards and scored on a 9-yard pass from Tarkenton to White. By the time Kilmer completed two touchdown passes in the fourth quarter, the game was already out of reach.

NFC Championship: vs. (#3) Los Angeles Rams

The Vikings forced a blocked field goal, a blocked punt, and two interceptions en route to the victory over the Rams. On offense, running back Chuck Foreman rushed for 118 yards and a touchdown on just 15 carries while also catching 5 passes for 81 yards.

In the first quarter, the Rams got off to a good start as they marched down the field to the Viking 2-yard line. The drive stalled there, and coach Chuck Knox, recalling the NFC championship game in Minnesota two years ago (when the Rams were intercepted in the end zone after driving to the Viking 2-yard line) ordered a field goal attempt. Nate Allen blocked the field goal attempt, and the ball bounced off the ground right into the waiting arms of Bobby Bryant, who returned it 90 yards for a Minnesota touchdown. The first quarter ended with the Rams dominating the stat sheet. They had run 22 plays for 89 yards and 7 first downs, while holding the Vikings to 5 plays, one first down, and 17 yards, but they still trailed 7–0.

In the second quarter, linebacker Matt Blair blocked and recovered a punt on the Rams 10-yard line to set up Fred Cox's 25-yard field goal to give the Vikings a 10–0 lead before halftime. Then in the third period, Foreman rushed 62 yards to the Los Angeles 2-yard line, and scored on a 1-yard touchdown run two plays later to increase the lead 17–0.

The Rams rallied back with two quick touchdowns in the third quarter. After a chance to put the game away was wiped out by Monte Jackson's interception of a Tarkenton pass in the end zone, Pat Haden led the Rams on an 80-yard drive highlighted by a 40-yard pass to Harold Jackson, and culminating in a 10-yard touchdown run by Lawrence McCutcheon. Rams kicker Tom Dempsey missed the extra point. Dempsey had missed nine extra points during the season. Announcers Pat Summerall and Tom Brookshier speculated that Haden was feeling pressure on this drive because Knox had James Harris warming up on the sidelines. On the Vikings' next drive, Fred Dryer hit Fran Tarkenton on a sack, forcing a fumble that was recovered by Jack Youngblood at the Viking 8-yard line. Three plays later, Haden hit Jackson for a 5-yard touchdown pass.

Late in the fourth quarter, the Vikings defense snuffed out two big chances for LA to take the lead. With 7 minutes left, the Rams drove to a third down on the Vikings 33, but Minnesota linebacker Wally Hilgenberg sacked Haden and forced a punt. With 2:40 left in the game, Los Angeles advanced to the Minnesota 39-yard line. On fourth down and needing more than a field goal, Haden thought he had Jackson open deep near the goal line, but Bryant intercepted the pass (his second of the game) rather than batting it down. A few plays later, Tarkenton dumped a short pass off to Foreman, which he turned into a 57-yard gain. Foreman was injured on the play, but backup running back Sammy Johnson scored the clinching touchdown from 12 yards out.

This turned out to be the last playoff game at Metropolitan Stadium. The Vikings played four playoff games between 1977 and 1981, all on the road. Minnesota's next home playoff game came after the strike-shortened 1982 season, the Vikings' first in the Hubert H. Humphrey Metrodome. They would next host an outdoor home playoff game in January 2016.

To date, this is the most recent NFC Championship that the Vikings have won.

Super Bowl XI: vs. (#1) Oakland Raiders

Statistics

Team leaders

League rankings

References

Minnesota Vikings seasons
National Football Conference championship seasons
Minnesota
NFC Central championship seasons
Minnesota Vikings